The ChS3 is a type of 4-axle passenger direct current (catenary voltage of 3 kV) electric locomotive, manufactured in 1961, which was used in the Soviet Union and the Russian Federation. In 1960, due to the increase in passenger trains, the Skoda factory was ordered to design and produce a more powerful locomotive type than the ChS1. The plant's management decided to base the new electric locomotives on the ChS1 class of locomotive. Therefore, the more powerful AL4846eT traction motors and traction drive were installed in the experimental ChS1 locomotive (which had the factory designation 29E0). Thus, the ChS3 design was an improved version of the ChS1.

Production
All 87 ChS3 locomotives were built in 1961.

Service
The ChS3 started off serving the Moscow-Kharkov line, before being transferred to the Trans-Siberian Railway, where they operated until 1991. They were often used in pairs. They were gradually replaced with electric ChS2 locomotives.

Standard gauge version
A  version was produced by Skoda for Czechoslovakia ČSD Class E 499.1 and Poland PKP class EP05.

The Polish PKP class ET40 Bo-Bo+Bo-Bo locomotive was also based on the design of the ChS3.

Gallery

See also
 The Museum of the Moscow Railway, at Paveletsky Rail Terminal, Moscow
 Rizhsky Rail Terminal, Moscow, Home of the Moscow Railway Museum
 Varshavsky Rail Terminal, St.Petersburg, Home of the Central Museum of Railway Transport, Russian Federation
 History of rail transport in Russia

References 
 Rakov VA Electric CHS1 and CHS3 series / / Locomotives domestic railways 1956 - 1975. - Moscow: Transport, 1999. - S. 52 - 53. - 

Škoda locomotives
Electric locomotives of Russia
Electric locomotives of the Soviet Union
Bo′Bo′ locomotives
Railway locomotives introduced in 1961
5 ft gauge locomotives